Hulstina imitatrix is a species of geometrid moth in the family Geometridae. It is found in North America.

The MONA or Hodges number for Hulstina imitatrix is 6541.

Subspecies
These two subspecies belong to the species Hulstina imitatrix:
 Hulstina imitatrix fulva Rindge, 1970
 Hulstina imitatrix imitatrix

References

Further reading

 

Boarmiini
Articles created by Qbugbot
Moths described in 1970